Chris James Holdsworth (born October 24, 1987) is an American former mixed martial artist who competed in the Ultimate Fighting Championship. He was the winner of The Ultimate Fighter: Team Rousey vs. Team Tate.

Mixed martial arts career

Background
His father was a martial artist and Vietnam War veteran, his mother is a breast cancer survivor and his grandfather was a Golden Gloves boxer.

When he was eight years old, his elder brother was shot and killed. At his brother’s funeral, his sensei posthumously awarded him his black belt in American kickboxing. Holdsworth, aged 8, told his mother he wanted to be a martial artist just like his brother so he excelled in several martial arts, especially BJJ. He was awarded his blue belt from the legendary Royce Gracie, his purple belt by Rener, Ryron and Rorion Gracie, and was awarded his brown and black belt by Marc Laimon. At age 21 he was one of the youngest BJJ black belts in the US.

Amateur career
Holdsworth signed with the Tuff-N-Uff promotion in August 2009, and made his debut as an amateur against Justin Linn. He won his debut by triangle choke submission. He made a quick turnaround and faced Cameron Ramirez on September 18, 2009, and won the fight by TKO (punches). After taking a small hiatus, Holdsworth returned on February 26, 2010, facing Gor Mnatsakanyan. He won by TKO, extending his undefeated record to 3-0.

In his last amateur fight before turning pro, Holdsworth faced Anthony Gutierrez at Tuff-N-Uff: Xtreme Couture vs. Team Quest on August 6, 2010. He won by armbar, and turned pro in October of that year.

Professional MMA career
Holdsworth made his professional MMA debut in October 2010. He's a member of 'Team Alpha Male' and had 4 fights before joining the Ultimate Fighter. He won all of them by submission.

The Ultimate Fighter
In August 2013, it was announced that Holdsworth was one of the fighters selected to be on The Ultimate Fighter: Team Rousey vs. Team Tate.

Holdsworth faced Louis Fisette in the elimination fight to get into the house. He defeated him via arm-triangle choke in the first round.

Holdsworth was the second pick of Team Tate. During the first tournament fight in the house, Holdsworth faced team Rousey's #1 pick Chris Beal. Miesha Tate selected this match up because of a possible advantage when they heard that Beal probably had an injured hand.  The consensus was that Beal would have the better of the striking while Holdsworth would be dominant in the ground, but Beal was dominated in the striking, even being knocked down and then submitted via guillotine choke in the first round.

In the semifinals, Holdsworth faced off against Michael Wooten. He won the fight via rear-naked choke in the first round.

Ultimate Fighting Championship
Holdsworth faced Davey Grant in the finals on November 30, 2013 at The Ultimate Fighter 18 Finale. He won the bout via rear-naked choke in the second round.

Holdsworth was expected to face Kang Kyung-ho on May 24, 2014 at UFC 173.  However, Kang pulled out of the bout and was replaced by Chico Camus. He won the fight via unanimous decision.

Holdsworth has been absent from competitive fighting since 2014, with Holdsworth taking an indefinite hiatus from competition due to post-concussion syndrome.

Personal life
Holdsworth works as a coach for Team Alpha Male.

Championships and accomplishments
Ultimate Fighting Championship
The Ultimate Fighter 18 Tournament Winner
Submission of the Night (One time) vs. Davey Grant

Mixed martial arts record

|-
| Win
| align=center| 6–0
| Chico Camus
| Decision (unanimous)
| UFC 173
| 
| align=center| 3
| align=center| 5:00
| Las Vegas, Nevada, United States
| 
|-
| Win
| align=center| 5–0
| Davey Grant
| Submission (rear-naked choke)
| The Ultimate Fighter 18 Finale
| 
| align=center| 2
| align=center| 2:10
| Las Vegas, Nevada, United States
| 
|-
| Win
| align=center| 4–0
| Tyler Shinn
| Submission (triangle choke)
| RFA 4
| 
| align=center| 2
| align=center| 1:32
| Las Vegas, Nevada, United States
| 
|-
| Win
| align=center| 3–0
| Juan Rivas
| Submission (armbar)
| KOTC: Next Generation
| 
| align=center| 1
| align=center| 1:29
| Highland, California, United States
| 
|-
| Win
| align=center| 2–0
| Gustavo Limon
| Submission (rear-naked choke)
| Gladiator Challenge: Legends Collide 2 
| 
| align=center| 1
| align=center| 0:45
| San Jacinto, California, United States
| 
|-
| Win
| align=center| 1–0
| Randy Villarreal
| Submission (rear-naked choke)
| Xtreme Knockout 8 
| 
| align=center| 1
| align=center| 2:05
| Arlington, Texas, United States
|

Mixed martial arts exhibition record

|-
|Win
|align=center| 3–0
|Michael Wootten
|Submission (rear-naked choke)
| rowspan=3|The Ultimate Fighter: Team Rousey vs. Team Tate
| (airdate)
|align=center|1
|align=center|3:11
| rowspan=3|Las Vegas, Nevada, United States
|
|-
|Win 
|align=center|2–0
| Chris Beal
| Submission (guillotine choke) 
| (airdate)
|align=center|1
|align=center|4:16
|
|- 
|Win 
|align=center| 1–0 
| Louis Fisette 
|Submission (arm-triangle choke) 
| (airdate) 
|align=center|1
|align=center|4:09
|

Amateur mixed martial arts record

|-
|Win
|align=center| 4–0
|Anthony Gutierrez
|Submission (armbar)
|Tuff-N-Uff - Xtreme Couture vs. Team Quest
|
|align=center| 1
|align=center| 2:32
|Las Vegas, Nevada, United States
|
|-
|Win
|align=center| 3–0
|Gor Mnatsakanyan
|TKO (punches)
|Tuff-N-Uff - Future Stars of MMA
|
|align=center| 1
|align=center| 2:10
|Las Vegas, Nevada, United States
|
|-
|Win
|align=center| 2–0
|Cameron Ramirez
|TKO (punches)
|Tuff-N-Uff - Future Stars of MMA
|
|align=center| 1
|align=center| 1:31
|Las Vegas, Nevada, United States
|
|-
|Win
|align=center| 1–0
|Justin Linn
|Submission (triangle choke)
|Tuff-N-Uff - Back2Back
|
|align=center| 1
|align=center| 1:58
|Las Vegas, Nevada, United States
|

See also
 List of current UFC fighters
 List of male mixed martial artists

References

External links
 
 

American male mixed martial artists
Living people
1987 births
People from Van Nuys, Los Angeles
Bantamweight mixed martial artists
Mixed martial artists utilizing Brazilian jiu-jitsu
Ultimate Fighting Championship male fighters
American practitioners of Brazilian jiu-jitsu
People awarded a black belt in Brazilian jiu-jitsu